Pierre Desvages (born in Le Mesnil-Villement in 1867 - died ????) was a French cyclist of the early 1900s.

He participated in the 1903 Tour de France, the first Tour, and came 20th (second last), 62 hours, 53 minutes and 54 seconds behind the winner Maurice Garin.

Major competitions
 1903 Tour de France - 20th place
 1904 Tour de France - did not finish
 1905 Tour de France - did not finish
 1906 Tour de France - did not finish
 1907 Tour de France - did not finish
 1908 Tour de France - did not finish
 1909 Tour de France - did not finish
 1910 Tour de France - did not finish

References

French male cyclists
1867 births
Year of death missing
20th-century deaths
Sportspeople from Calvados (department)
Cyclists from Normandy